The King Fahd Hospital of the University (KFHU) in Khobar, Kingdom of Saudi Arabia is affiliated to Imam Abdulrahman Bin Faisal University (Formerly called University of Dammam, which was previously a part of King Faisal University). It was founded in 1981 (1401H) under the 'Five Hospitals Project' and was inaugurated by then Minister for Health, Dr. Hussain Al Jazairy. The hospital's main purpose is the training of students during their clinical years. It has a 440-bed capacity distributed in a four-floor building. Each floor has different wards and serves a different category of patients. When The hospital was established the main goal was to provide three services: 
 Curative services
 Teaching services
 Researches

Healthcare information system 
The hospital uses a computerized system. It includes only the clinical services while the administrative services use another application.

Clinical system 
QuadraMed is divided into three subsystems: prod, dev, and train. Prod refers to production which is the main "real system" that users deal with  directly. Dev refers to development which is used to develop new requirements then test them to make sure they work well. Dev is used to prevent excess work load on the main system "Prod". Every two months after testing the new  applications they are transferred from "dev" to "prod". The last subsystem is "train", used to train staff and student usually in the skill lab.

Administrative system 
The hospital administrative application is not integrated with QuadraMed. They use their own visual basic applications created by IT team in the hospital.

Medical records in KFHU 
At KFHU the medical records are identified by Numeric (unit numbering) which means that each patient has a unique number. Furthermore, the filing system in the hospital is straight numeric.

See also

 List of hospitals in Saudi Arabia
 List of things named after Saudi Kings

References

Hospital buildings completed in 1981
Hospitals in Saudi Arabia
Medical education in Saudi Arabia
Teaching hospitals
Hospitals established in 1981
Imam Abdulrahman Bin Faisal University